Mansfield Tracy Walworth (December 3, 1830 – June 3, 1873) was an American writer. Born in 1830, the son of Reuben H. Walworth, State Chancellor of New York, and Maria Ketchum Averill. In 1852 he married Ellen Hardin Walworth, his step sister. The marriage would break up due to his abusive tendencies. In 1873, Walworth was murdered by his own son Frank Walworth at the Sturdevant House Hotel, Manhattan. He was buried in Greenridge Cemetery.

Bibliography 
 The mission of death: a tale of the New York penal laws (1850)
 Hotspur.: A tale of the old Dutch manor (1864)
 Warwick: or, The lost nationalities of America. A novel (1869)
 Stormcliff. A tale of the highlands (1871)
 Lulu. A tale of the National hotel poisoning (1871)
 Delaplaine: or, The sacrifice of Irene. A novel (1872)
 Beverly; or, The white mask (1872)
 Married in mask: a novel (1888)
Zahara, or A leap for empire (1888)

References

American writers
1830 births
1873 murders in the United States
Patricides
1873 deaths